Curtis Gove Callan Jr. (born October 11, 1942) is an American theoretical physicist and the James S. McDonnell Distinguished University Professor of Physics at Princeton University. He has conducted research in gauge theory, string theory, instantons, black holes, strong interactions, and many other topics.  He was awarded the Sakurai Prize in 2000 ("For his classic formulation of the renormalization group, his contributions to instanton physics and to the theory of monopoles and strings") and the Dirac Medal in 2004.

Biography
Callan received his B.Sc. in physics from Haverford College. He then pursued graduate studies in physics at Princeton University, where he was a student under Sam Treiman. Callan received his Ph.D. in physics in 1964 after completing a doctoral dissertation titled "Spherically symmetric cosmological models."

His Ph.D. students include Vijay Balasubramanian, William E. Caswell, Peter Woit, Igor Klebanov and Juan Maldacena.

Callan is best known for his work on broken scale invariance (Callan–Symanzik equation) and has also made leading contributions to quantum field theory and string theory in the areas of dyon-fermion dynamics, string solitons and black holes.

Callan has been a member of the JASON defense advisory group since 1968, and was chair of the group from 1990 to 1995. He served as president of the American Physical Society (APS) in 2010. He was elected a Fellow of the APS in 1971.

Callan was elected as a member of the American Academy of Arts and Sciences in 1987 and as a member of the National Academy of Sciences in 1989.

References

External links
 Research page at Princeton.
 
 Callan's publications on INSPIRE-HEP.

American string theorists
1942 births
Living people
Fellows of the American Physical Society
J. J. Sakurai Prize for Theoretical Particle Physics recipients
Members of the United States National Academy of Sciences
Members of JASON (advisory group)
Princeton University alumni
Haverford College alumni
Trustees of the Institute for Advanced Study
21st-century American physicists
20th-century American physicists
Presidents of the American Physical Society